Sunamganj-5 is a constituency represented in the Jatiya Sangsad (National Parliament) of Bangladesh since 2008 by Mohibur Rahman Manik of the Awami League.

Boundaries 
The constituency encompasses Chhatak and Dowarabazar upazilas.

History 
The constituency was created in 1984 from the Sylhet-12 constituency when the former Sylhet District was split into four districts: Sunamganj, Sylhet, Moulvibazar, and Habiganj.

Ahead of the 2008 general election, the Election Commission redrew constituency boundaries to reflect population changes revealed by the 2001 Bangladesh census. The 2008 redistricting altered the boundaries of the constituency.

Ahead of the 2014 general election, the Election Commission expanded the boundaries of the constituency. Previously it had excluded one union parishad of Dowarabazar Upazila: Mannargaon.

Members of Parliament

Elections

Elections in the 2000s

Elections in the 1990s

References

External links
 

Parliamentary constituencies in Bangladesh
Sunamganj District